PlayMonster (formerly, Patch Products) is a manufacturer and marketer of family entertainment products that specializes in games, children's puzzles, toys, activities, and teaching tools. As of February 2016, Patch changed its company name to PlayMonster.

History

Patch Products

1971 
Brothers Fran and Bryce Patch opened a commercial printing company, producing games and related items for other companies. They printed Trivial Pursuit game boards and Cabbage Patch Kids sticker books, among other products.

1985 
Fran and Bryce Patch began their own toy and game company: Patch Products. The company started a line of PuzzlePatch tray puzzles for preschoolers, which are still in production; the company produced its 100 millionth puzzle in 2008. The American Toy Institute, Great American Toy Contest, National Association for Gifted Children, Nick Jr. Magazine and Toy Tips have recognized the puzzles for helping educate children.

1992 
The company obtained the license for TriBond, its first board game, which was inducted into Games Magazine's Hall of Fame.

2000 
Patch followed the success of TriBond with two other board games, Blurt! and MadGab. The company sold the brand rights to these games to Mattel in 2004.

2008 
In 2008, Patch Products acquired Smethport Specialty Co., the maker of Lauri Toys and specialty products, adding educational items to Patch's lineup, including Tall-Stackers pegging and crepe rubber puzzles, along with the Wooly Willy magnetic personality.

2009 
Patch Products secured the rights to create a fresh version of the popular Are You Smarter Than a 5th Grader? board game based on the TV show hosted by Jeff Foxworthy.

2010 
Patch Products introduced 5 Second Rule. 5 Second Rule would go on to be played on The Ellen Show for over six years. Patch Products also developed a nostalgic line called Treasured Toys, which included bringing back favorites Yakity-Yak Teeth, Shark Attack, and Bed Bugs.

2011 
5 Second Rule was a finalist for Game of the Year TOTY Award.

2012 
Patch Products was honored with a Wisconsin Family Business of the Year Award. The Work Hard—Play Hard Award was given to Patch to recognize the company's emphasis on family fun to promote togetherness.

2013 
Patch Products, was the distributor of the Perplexus 3D maze game to independent toy and gift stores. It also became the new manufacturer and distributor of the well-known The Game of THINGS... Patch debuted its new collectible soft doll line Planet Sock Monkey which adds attitude and style to the classic sock monkey: each doll features a its own name, personality, clothing, and accessories.

2014 
Patch Products was acquired by the private equity firm Topspin Partners.  Shortly after, Patch Products grew with the acquisition of Onaroo, previously owned by American Innovative, LLC. This brand allowed Patch Products to expand into a new, complementary category of children's room décor.

PlayMonster

2016 
Patch Products changed its name to PlayMonster. The new name better reflected the company’s values and commitment to providing play for all ages.

2017 
PlayMonster had multiple TOTY Award finalists, and won Game of the Year with their kids game Yeti in My Spaghetti. PlayMonster also acquired Tinkineer and its Marbleocity line (laser-cut STEM kits).

2018 
Topspin sold PlayMonster to Audax Private Equity. PlayMonster also acquired the UK-based toy company Interplay UK Ltd.

2019 
PlayMonster acquired Set Enterprises. PlayMonster also acquired Kahootz Toys. Patriot Capital became an investor in PlayMonster at this time.

2021 
Interplay, acquired in 2016, rebranded to PlayMonster. PlayMonster also acquired Ann Williams Group, a Michigan-based manufacturer of craft and activity kits for kids and adults. Additionally, PlayMonster partnered with Dude Perfect to relaunch the Koosh brand, licensed by Hasbro, in time for the 35th anniversary of Koosh.

2022 
PlayMonster promoted Tim Kilpin to CEO and gained investments from private market firms Adams Street Partners and H.I.G Capital. PlayMonster also relaunched Glo Friends, licensed by Hasbro. PlayMonster's take on the Glo Friends line introduces products featuring elements of Social–Emotional Learning.

2023 
Tim Kilpin transitioned to the newly created role of Executive Chairman and a member of the Board of Directors. Sitting President, Steve Adolph, was appointed Chief Executive Officer.

Award-winning games 

PlayMonster has won awards from Oppenheim Toy Portfolio, Dr. Toy, The National Parenting Center, iParenting Media Awards, Parents' Choice, and Toy Tips. Award-winning games include: What's Yours Like?, 5 Second Rule, Buzzword, Know It or Blow It, Malarky, Don't Rock the Boat, Big Little Games Flingin' Frogs, Toss Up!, Swap!, Roll-It Tic-Tac-Toe, Giant Spoons, 100 Wacky Things, Word Shout, Farkle Frenzy, and Tales to Play

Million Minute Family Challenge 
From September through December every year, PlayMonster sponsors the Million Minute Family Challenge, a grass-roots effort to promote interaction and communication among family and friends through playing board games. The goal is to encourage at least one thousand families, groups, or organizations in each of the fifty states to play a board game together for twenty minutes, or a cumulative million minutes.

Toys based on Netflix's Harvey Girls Forever!

References

External links 
 PlayMonster
 Million Minute Family Challenge
 Perplexus
 The Game of Things...

Toy companies of the United States